Speckled teal has been divided taxonomically into two species.  It could refer to the following two species of waterfowl:

Yellow-billed teal, Anas flavirostris
Andean teal, Anas andium